The 1921–22 French Rugby Union Championship of first division was won by Toulouse beating Bayonne in the final.

The qualification round was completed by two pools of five teams.
Stade Toulousain and Bayonne were the teams who qualified to the final.

Context 
The 1922 Five Nations Championship was won by Wales, while France came last.

First round 
Thirty clubs participated, divided into 10 pools of 3 (with home and away matches).
3 points were awarded for a win, 2 for a draw, 1 for a loss.

The winner of each pool qualified four the semifinal pool.

Pool A 
 US Perpignan 6 pts,
 Toulouse OEC 4 pts,
 Nantes2 pts
Pool B 
 Toulouse 6 pts,
 Boucau 4 pts,
 Chalon 2 pts
Pool C 
 Racing Paris 6 pts,
 SA Bordeaux 4 pts,
 Agen 2 pts
Pool D 
Biarritz 6 pts,
 Stade Saint-Gaudens 3 pts,
 Lézignan 3 pts
Pool E 
Dax 6 pts,
 Saint-Girons 4 pts,
 Bergerac 2 pts
Pool F 
 Grenoble 6 pts,
 Stade Français 4 pts,
 Narbonne 2 pts
Pool G 
 Carcassonne 6 pts,
 Stade bordelais 4 pts,
 AS Bayonne 2 pts
Pool H 
 Bayonne 6 pts,
 Toulon4 pts,
 Casteljaloux 2 pts
Pool I 
 Lourdes 6 pts,
 Périgueux4 pts,
 CASG 2 pts
Pool J 
 Béziers 5 pts,
 Stadoceste tarbais 5 pts,
 Pau 2 pts

Second round

Two groups of five played, with the winners qualifying onto the final.

Pool A 

Bayonne 11 pts,
US Perpignan 10 pts,
Lourdes 8 pts
Dax 6 pts
Grenoble 4 pts

Pool B 

Toulouse 12 pts,
 Biarritz 9 pts,
 Racing Paris 9 pts,
 Béziers 6 pts,
 Carcassonne4 pts

Final

External links
 Compte rendu de la finale de 1922, sur lnr.fr

1922
France
Championship